Peckoltia capitulata is a species of catfish in the family Loricariidae. It is native to South America, where it occurs in the Approuague River in French Guiana. It was initially collected from an area of the river with a swift, strong current that was noted to be unusually turbid at the time of collection due to illegal gold mining in the area. The species reaches 7.6 cm (3 inches) SL. Its specific epithet, capitulata, is derived from Latin and reportedly refers to the characteristically small head of the species.

References 

Ancistrini
Fish described in 2012
Fish of South America